Cicindela formosa, the big sand tiger beetle, is a species of flashy tiger beetle in the family Carabidae. It is found in North America.

Subspecies
These six subspecies belong to the species Cicindela formosa:
 Cicindela formosa formosa Say, 1817 (big sand tiger beetle)
 Cicindela formosa generosa Dejean, 1831 (big sand tiger beetle)
 Cicindela formosa gibsoni Brown, 1940 (Gibson's sand tiger beetle)
 Cicindela formosa luxuriosa Casey
 Cicindela formosa pigmentosignata W. Horn, 1930 (big sand tiger beetle)
 Cicindela formosa rutilovirescens Rumpp, 1986

References

Further reading

External links

 

formosa
Articles created by Qbugbot
Beetles described in 1817